The American Council for Judaism (ACJ) is an organization of American Jews committed to the proposition that Jews are not a national but a religious group, adhering to the original stated principles of Reform Judaism, as articulated in the 1885 Pittsburgh Platform. In particular, it is notable for its historical opposition to Zionism. Although it has since moderated its stance on the issue, it still advocates that American Jews distance themselves from Israel politically, and does not view Israel as a universal Jewish homeland. The ACJ has also championed women's rights, including the right for women to serve as rabbis, and has supported Reform Jewish congregations and contributed to the publication of new editions of prayer books for religious services predominately in the English language for Jews in English-speaking countries.

Background and formation 
The rabbis of Reform Judaism had opposed Zionism prior to World War I, supporting freedom, democracy and equal rights for Jews in the countries where they lived. The influential American Jewish Committee was also anti-Zionist until 1918, when it shifted to a non-Zionist platform until the 1967 Six-Day War. The Central Conference of American Rabbis of the Reform movement declared itself officially neutral on Zionism in 1937.

In 1942, a split within the Reform movement occurred due to the passage of a resolution by some rabbis endorsing the raising of a "Jewish Army" in Palestine to fight alongside the Allies of World War II. The American and British general staffs opposed placing Jews in segregated armed forces. The founders of the American Council for Judaism regarded the potential segregation of Jews to be a highly regressive and harmful measure.

The ACJ was founded in June 1942 by a group of leading Reform rabbis including six former presidents of the Central Conference of American Rabbis and the president of the Hebrew Union College, as well as laymen, who opposed the creation of a religiously segregated Jewish Army to fight alongside the Allies and the new political direction of some in their movement, including, but not limited to, on the issue of Zionism as redefined by the Biltmore Program in May 1942. The leading rabbis included Louis Wolsey, Morris Lazaron, Abraham Cronbach, David Philipson, and Henry Cohen but their most vocal representative for a time became Elmer Berger, who became the council's Executive Director.

The ACJ described itself as anti-nationalist, and followed a universalist interpretation of Jewish history and destiny. According to its statement of principles, the ACJ supported the "rehabilitation" of Palestine, and did not support political Zionism. It also declared that "Jewish nationalism tends to confuse our fellowmen about our place and function in society and diverts our own attention from our historic role to live as a religious community wherever we may dwell." The ACJ's leaders felt that they represented the views of a majority of American Jews, and began a large membership drive. By 1946, it had numerous local chapters throughout the United States and regional offices in Richmond, Chicago, Dallas, and San Francisco.

During World War II, the council was active in opposing Zionism. In 1944, it protested the formation of the Jewish Brigade by the British Army, which was composed of Palestinian Jews led by British-Jewish officers. In a message to Secretary of State Cordell Hull and Secretary of War Henry L. Stimson, it stated that "newspapers report a British Government decision to form a so-called Jewish Brigade under a so-called Jewish flag. We hereby protest against that action and designation. We urge that our military and civil officials be warned against that error and instructed to use the accurate designation of Zionist Brigade and Zionist flag. Americans of the Jewish faith are and always have been in the American armed forces. The flag of Americans of the Jewish faith is the Stars and Stripes."

While protesting the White Paper of 1939, which imposed strict limits on Jewish immigration to Palestine and land purchases in the country, it also opposed "Zionist nationalism" and urged American Jews to "organize in strength, out of deep concern for oppressed Jews everywhere, behind a non-nationalistic program to deal with the total Jewish problem." It declared that "Beyond the abrogation of the White Paper lies the need for a basic solution. That solution, we believe, can come only when there is world wide recognition of the rights of Jews to full equality. It can come in Palestine only when the pretensions to Jewish Statehood are abandoned and we seek instead freedom of migration opportunity based on incontestable rights and not on special privilege. The declaration of our Statement of Principles is beyond challenge from any quarter. We look forward to the ultimate establishment of a democratic autonomous government in Palestine, wherein Jews, Moslems and Christians shall be justly represented; every man enjoying equal rights and sharing equal responsibilities; a democratic government in which our fellow Jews shall be free Palestinians whose religion is Judaism even as we are Americans whose religion is Judaism."

Postwar anti-Zionist campaign
Following World War II, with the question of Palestine's future being considered, the ACJ continued to support a joint Jewish-Arab state rather than a Jewish state in Palestine, and opposed dispossessing the Arabs who were then living in Palestine. The presidency of the ACJ was accepted by the well-known philanthropist Lessing J. Rosenwald, who took the lead in urging the creation of a unitary democratic state in Mandatory Palestine in American policy-making circles. Rosenwald testified before the Anglo-American Committee of Inquiry in 1946, urged the creation of a unitary Jewish-Arab state in Palestine, and allowing Jewish immigration to Palestine to continue only upon "renunciation of the claim that Jews possess unlimited national right to the land, and that the country shall take the form of a racial or theocratic state," and said that the United States and other UN member states should allow more Jewish immigration to solve the European-Jewish refugee problem. It later endorsed the Committee of Inquiry's recommendations, including that Palestine become neither a Jewish or Arab state and the admittance of 100,000 Jewish refugees into Palestine. In addition, it opposed the establishment of a Jewish state anywhere else in the world, not just in Palestine. The ACJ's official position was that European Jews should be rehabilitated by restoring their civil, political, and economic security. To demonstrate that American Zionists did not represent the views of American Jewry, the ACJ sent anti-Zionist letters to various government officials.

Terrorism and illegal immigration to Palestine 
During the Jewish insurgency in Palestine, a campaign against the British by Jewish underground groups in Palestine (the Haganah, Irgun, and Lehi), the ACJ opposed what it viewed as Jewish terrorism. Following the King David Hotel bombing, it issued a statement calling for American Jews to "repudiate the perpetrators of those outrages and those leaders of Jews, in and out of Palestine, whose incitement is equally responsible." In a statement, Lessing Rosenwald called for the American Jewish community to condition any further assistance to the Yishuv (Palestinian Jewry) on the end of violence. It also opposed the Haganah's Aliyah Bet program, which attempted to bring Jewish refugees into Palestine illegally past a British blockade. Following a statement by the vice-president of the Zionist Organization of America that American Jews were prepared to spend millions to finance illegal immigration to Palestine, Rosenwald repudiated him, calling Aliyah Bet a "shocking disregard for law and order" and stating "lawlessness even in the name of mercy cannot be tolerated." In the final year before the founding of the State of Israel in 1948, the Council became very close to San Francisco born rabbi Judah Magnes, humanitarian and founder of the Hebrew University of Jerusalem and the leading Palestinian-Jewish advocate for a binational state, who was forced to return to the United States. In 1948, the ACJ had 14,000 members.

After 1948 
After the State of Israel declared independence in 1948, the ACJ continued its anti-Zionist campaign, leading to the resignation of several prominent Reform rabbis, including its founder, Louis Wolsey, who called on the ACJ to dissolve itself since the Zionist movement had succeeded. In a speech to his congregation, Wolsey said that "I believe we should support the present reality of a land of Israel, with all our strength." The ACJ responded by stating that "we shall continue to seek the integration of Jews into American life. We are convinced that this necessary integration cannot be accomplished as members of a separatistic national group with national interests in a foreign state." Its position was that to American Jews, Israel was not the state or homeland of the Jewish people, but merely a foreign country. In December 1948, Lessing Rosenwald urged that the US condition friendship with Israel on Israel building an inclusive Israeli nationalism confined to its own borders and inclusive of its Muslim and Christian citizens rather than Jewish nationalism. Murray Polner, a historian of Judaism in the United States, wrote that "by 1948, with the establishment of an independent Israel, the council had earned the enmity of the vast majority of American Jewry, who viewed the group as indifferent, if not hostile, to Jews who had lived through the Holocaust and had nowhere to go."

The ACJ switched its focus to battling what it viewed as its primary foe—the political influence of Zionism upon American Jewry. In addition to supporting a network of religious schools committed to Classical Reform Judaism, the Council fought American-Jewish fundraising for Israel and agitated against the merging of Zionist fund-raising organizations with local Jewish community boards, provided financial aid to Jews emigrating from Israel and to Palestinian refugees, and enjoyed friendly relations with the Eisenhower State Department under John Foster Dulles. The ACJ also vocally supported the efforts of William Fulbright to have the lobbyists for Israel in the United States legally registered as foreign agents. In 1955, the ACJ's head, Elmer Berger, advocated the complete assimilation of Jews into American life by switching the Jewish Sabbath from Saturday to Sunday, creating a new menorah to "reflect the appreciation of American Jews of the freedom of life in the United States," and for the interpretation of the holiday of Sukkot "to be broadened to take on meaning to [all] citizens of an industrial society."

Support 
Support for the American Council for Judaism came primarily from Jews of British, Dutch, French and German descent who were historically attached to Classical Reform Judaism, but also from many Jewish socialists who opposed Zionism, and many more who were uncomfortable with the Jewish religion coalesced around William Zukerman and his Jewish Newsletter. Jewish intellectuals who at one time or another passed through the Council included David Riesman, Hans Kohn, Erich Fromm, Hannah Arendt, Will Herberg, Morrie Ryskind, Frank Chodorov, and Murray Rothbard.  Among the notable gentile friends of the council were Dorothy Thompson, Norman Thomas, Freda Utley, Arnold J. Toynbee, and Dwight Macdonald. The ACJ was particularly influential in San Francisco, Philadelphia, Houston, Chicago, Baltimore, Washington, D.C., Atlanta, and Dallas.

Later activities 
The ACJ rapidly declined in both political activity and influence following the Six-Day War in 1967, when the American Jewish community was swept up in overwhelming support of Israel, and moderates within the Council forced Elmer Berger to resign the following year for declaring that Israel had been the primary aggressor in the war. The council continued to support progressive Judaism, but its views became less popular with American Jewry, and as a result it shrank. According to The New York Times, it was effectively "consigned to irrelevancy." In 2010, its mailing list was only a few thousand.

The ACJ has since moderated its views on the state of Israel, but does not view it as a universal Jewish homeland, and advocates equal rights and religious freedom for all people living there. According to its statement of principles, "the State of Israel has significance for the Jewish experience. As a refuge for many Jews who have suffered persecution and oppression in other places, Israel certainly has meaning for us. However, that relationship is a spiritual, historical, and humanitarian one—it is not a political tie. As American Jews, we share the hope for the security and well being of the State of Israel, living in peace and justice with its neighbors". Allan C. Brownfeld, the editor of the ACJ's magazine, who has strongly criticized Israel in the Washington Report on Middle Easts Affairs (WRMEA), said that "I think we represent a silent majority. We are Americans by nationality and Jews by religion. And while we wish Israel well, we don't view it as our homeland." In the United States, the council seeks "to advance the universal principles of a Judaism free of nationalism, and the national, civic, cultural, and social integration into American institutions of Americans of Jewish faith."

Issues magazine 
The organization publishes a magazine called Issues, which is published in print and online.

References
 Kolsky, Thomas Jews Against Zionism: The American Council for Judaism, 1942-1948 Temple University Press, 1992.
 Ross, Jack. Rabbi Outcast: Elmer Berger & American Jewishj Anti-Zionism.

External links and further reading
 American Council for Judaism Official website

Classical Reform Judaism
Reform Judaism in the United States
Jewish anti-Zionism in the United States
Jewish anti-Zionist organizations
Jewish religious organizations
Jewish organizations based in the United States
Jewish organizations established in 1942
1942 establishments in the United States
Reform anti-Zionism
Reform Jewish feminism